Rabbit Is Rich is a 1981 novel by John Updike.  It is the third novel of the tetralogy that begins with Rabbit, Run, continues with Rabbit Redux, and concludes with Rabbit at Rest.  There is also a related novella, Rabbit Remembered (2001).  Rabbit Is Rich was awarded the Pulitzer Prize for Fiction and the National Book Award for Fiction in 1982, as well as the National Book Critics Circle Award for Fiction in 1981. The first-edition hardcover "rainbow" dust jacket for the novel was designed by the author and is significantly different from the horizontal-stripe designs deployed on the other three Rabbit novel covers. Subsequent printings, however, including trade paperbacks, feature the stripe motif with stock images of a set of car keys or an image of a late-1970s Japanese automobile.

Plot summary

This third novel of Updike's Rabbit series examines the life of Harry "Rabbit" Angstrom, a one-time high school basketball star, who has reached a paunchy middle-age without relocating from Brewer, Pennsylvania, the poor, fictional city of his birth.  Harry and Janice, his wife of 22 years, live comfortably, having inherited her late father's  Toyota dealership.  He is indeed rich, but Harry's persistent problems—his wife's drinking, his troubled son's schemes, his libido, and spectres from his past—complicate life. Having achieved an opulent lifestyle that would have embarrassed his working-class parents, Harry is not greedy, but neither is he ever quite satisfied.  Harry has grown smitten with a country-club friend's young wife. He worries about Nelson, his indecisive son, a student at Kent State University. Throughout the book, Harry wonders whether his former lover, Ruth, ever gave birth to their illegitimate daughter.

Notes

References

External links
 The New York Times review

1981 American novels
National Book Award for Fiction winning works
Novels by John Updike
Pulitzer Prize for Fiction-winning works
Alfred A. Knopf books
Novels set in Pennsylvania
Petrofiction
National Book Critics Circle Award-winning works